Nayanagar is a village located at  in the Rosera Subdivision of Samastipur district.Total Population of Nayanagar is 10247 as of 2011 Census.

Villages in Samastipur district